Offshoot may refer to:

 Offshoot, a newer name for the Transformers character "Firebolt", who is Targetmaster partner to Hot Rod/Rodimus
 Offshoot Films, a digital media company
 Offshoot (plant), a concept in botany

See also 
 Spin-off (disambiguation)